Nathalie Gingras (born 3 March 1964) is a Canadian swimmer. She competed in the women's 400 metre individual medley at the 1984 Summer Olympics.

References

External links
 

1964 births
Living people
Canadian female medley swimmers
Olympic swimmers of Canada
Swimmers at the 1984 Summer Olympics
People from LaSalle, Quebec
Swimmers from Montreal